Abel Vázquez Cortijo (born 3 August 1989) is a judo athlete from Spain who has represented Spain at the 2011 and 2013 IPC European Championships, and the 2008 and 2012 Summer Paralympics.

Personal 
Vázquez is vision impaired, and is from Seville. He completed a Bachelor of Science in Physical Activity and Sport. In 2013, he was attending Pablo de Olavide University in Seville where he was working on completing a Masters of Teaching in Secondary Education.

Judo 
Vázquez won a bronze medal at the 2011 European Championships held in Crawley, England. In October 2011, he competed in a regional Spanish national vision impaired judo event in Guadalajara. In November 2013, he competed in the Open Judo Tournament Guadalajara. The 2013 IPC European Judo Championships were held in early December in Eger, Hungary, and he competed in them.  He came away with a silver medal in the less than 81 kilogram group.  He competed against Ukrainian Olexandr Kosinov for the bronze medal.  The national team, coached by Vicente Arolas, treated the event as preparation for the 2016 Summer Paralympics. In 2013, he was one of seven Paralympic sportspeople to get a 2013/2014 "Iberdrola Foundation Scholarship" that was awarded by the Spanish Paralympic Committee, Iberdrola Foundation, the Spanish Sports Council and the Spanish Ministry of Social Services and Equality.  It provided him with €490 a month for the ten academic months of the year.

Paralympics 
Vázquez competed in judo at the 2008 Summer Paralympics and 2012 Summer Paralympics.  In London, he finished in fourth place after losing in the bronze medal match.

Notes

References

External links 
 

1989 births
Living people
Spanish male judoka
Paralympic judoka of Spain
Judoka at the 2012 Summer Paralympics
Judoka at the 2008 Summer Paralympics
Visually impaired category Paralympic competitors
Spanish blind people